The Abyss was a Swedish black metal side project by members of the death metal band Hypocrisy. They were active from 1994 to 1998 and recorded two albums. The Other Side was the first album recorded in The Abyss studio.

Members 
 Peter Tägtgren – vocals, drums, bass
 Lars Szöke – guitars, vocals
 Mikael Hedlund – guitars, vocals

Discography 
 The Other Side (1995)
 Summon the Beast (1996)
 In Conspiracy with Satan (1998) – a Bathory tribute album, covered the song "Armageddon"

References 

Swedish black metal musical groups
Musical groups established in 1994
1994 establishments in Sweden
Musical groups disestablished in 1998